Frohen-le-Grand is a former commune in the Somme département in the Picardie region of France. Since 1 January 2007, Frohen-le-Grand and Frohen-le-Petit have combined into the new commune of Frohen-sur-Authie.

Geography

Population

References

Former communes of Somme (department)
Populated places disestablished in 2007